Karl Matthew Krikken (born 9 April 1969) is a former English cricketer who played for Derbyshire County Cricket Club, primarily as a wicket-keeper, between 1987 and 2003.

Krikken was born in Farnworth, Lancashire, the son of Brian Krikken, a wicket-keeper with Lancashire and Worcestershire between 1966 and 1969. Krikken joined Derbyshire in the 1987 season and was the club's first-choice wicket-keeper for most of his career after displacing Bernie Maher in the side. He was also a lower-order right-handed batsman.

A highlight of his career was winning the 1993 Benson & Hedges Cup with Derbyshire. Krikken shared an unbeaten 77-run partnership with man of the match Dominic Cork in the narrow victory over Lancashire in the final, scoring 37 not out.

After his retirement, he became Derbyshire's Academy Coach in late 2003, having earned the ECB's Level 4 Coaching Certificate. Krikken was appointed as the club's Head Coach in June 2011.

References

External links

1969 births
Living people
English cricketers
Derbyshire cricketers
English cricket coaches
Cricketers from Bolton
Griqualand West cricketers
Wicket-keepers